Lester McClain (born September 17, 1949) is a former American football wide receiver and the first African American to play at the University of Tennessee.  He joined the Volunteers in 1967, and played for them between 1968 and 1970 (freshmen were ineligible to play varsity prior to the 1970s).  He was drafted by the Chicago Bears in the 9th round (220th overall) of the 1971 NFL Draft, but was cut prior to the season.  He attended  Antioch High School in Antioch, Tennessee.

During his three seasons at Tennessee, he caught 70 passes for 1,003 yards and 10 touchdowns.  He also rushed 30 times for 123 yards and two touchdowns, and returned eight kickoffs for 168 yards.

See also

1970 Tennessee Volunteers football team
List of Tennessee Volunteers in the NFL Draft
1971 NFL draft

References

Living people
Players of American football from Nashville, Tennessee
Tennessee Volunteers football players
African-American players of American football
American football wide receivers
21st-century African-American people
1949 births